Langley Creek is a small river in San Mateo County, California and tributary to La Honda Creek, which in turn is tributary to San Gregorio Creek.

Notes

Rivers of San Mateo County, California
Rivers of Northern California